Andrea Grimes Parker is an American computer scientist, researcher, and Associate Professor, known for her interdisciplinary study of human computer interaction (HCI) and personal health informatics. Parker is currently an Associate Professor at Georgia Institute of Technology (Georgia Tech) School of Interactive Computing. She also currently serves as an Adjunct Associate Professor in the Rollins School of Public Health at Emory University.

She was previously an Assistant Professor at Northeastern University, with joint appointments in the Khoury College of Computer Sciences and the Bouvé College of Health Sciences.

Biography

Early life and education 

She was born Andrea Elaina Grimes, to African American parents Octavia R. Grimes and Vincent E. Grimes. Her father works at the Santa Clara County public defender's office and her mother is a nurse case manager with Kaiser Permanente in San Jose.

In 2004, she was one of two United States representatives for the 2004 World Association for Cooperative Education Conference. Parker attended Northeastern University and received a B.S. degree in Computer Science in 2005. Parker was a member of Phi Kappa Phi National Honors Society and Upsilon Pi Epsilon while at Northeastern.

In 2010, she married Lonnie Thomas Parker IV, a classmate at Georgia Tech. She changed her name in 2010, and has research papers in both names. In 2011, she received a PhD from Georgia Tech. Parker's doctoral advisor was Rebecca E. Grinter and her thesis was titled, "A Cultural, Community Based Approached to Health Technology Design".

Research career 
Parkers research lies generally in the fields of human-computer interaction (HCI) and computer-supported cooperative work (CSCW).

In 2010, OrderUP! was a game presented by Parker and colleagues at Ubicomp 2010 conference in Copenhagen, Denmark, created to teach people how to make smart choices when ordering food. The game was designed using Transtheoretical Model (TTM).

In 2013, Parker launched a social media platform to share workout tips, for people in the neighborhood of Roxbury that participate in a once a week gym program.

She has done research on the role of digital fitness trackers and social networks, and their impact on motivation, future planning, and behavior change. Parker is specifically interested in vulnerable and marginalized populations overcome barriers, and looking beyond the surface level interaction of data sharing found currently in many fitness trackers.

From 2014 until 2016, Parker served as the National Evaluator for the Aetna Foundation's portfolio of projects on mobile health interventions in community settings.

From 2018 until 2019, Parker was a Northeastern University Institute of Health Equity and Social Justice Research Faculty Scholar.

Teaching career 
Parker is the founder and director of the Wellness Technology Research Lab at Georgia Tech. Parker is currently an Associate Professor at Georgia Institute of Technology (Georgia Tech) School of Interactive Computing. She also currently serves as an Adjunct Associate Professor in the Rollins School of Public Health at Emory University.

She was previously an Assistant Professor at Northeastern University, with joint appointments in the Khoury College of Computer Sciences and the Bouvé College of Health Sciences.

Publications

Books

Articles

References

External links 

 Official website
Profile on Association for Computing Machinery (ACM) Digital Library
 
 Profile and profile on Microsoft Academic

African-American computer scientists
American women computer scientists
American computer scientists
Northeastern University alumni
Northeastern University faculty
Georgia Tech alumni
Georgia Tech faculty
Human–computer interaction researchers
Year of birth missing (living people)
Living people
21st-century African-American people